The yellow-crested manakin (Heterocercus flavivertex), also called the yellow-crowned manakin, is a species of bird in the family Pipridae, the manakins.

It is found in the Amazon Basin of Brazil and Colombia; also the Orinoco River and southern Venezuela. Its natural habitats are subtropical or tropical moist lowland forest and subtropical or tropical dry shrubland.

Amazon's Rio Negro range
The yellow-crested manakin's range is in a section of the northwestern Amazon Basin, (Amazonas state), and mostly the Rio Negro drainage and the adjacent northwest headwaters to the Caribbean-flowing Orinoco River of Venezuela. Its southern range limit is mostly the Rio Negro southern side, to its Amazonian headwaters in eastern Colombia.

Downriver it is found on the final 200 km of the south flowing Branco River of Roraima state; its contiguous section of range extends eastward, only north of and abutting the Amazon River to Amapá state's Trombetas River, the final third. It is not found downriver eastwards beyond the Trombetas–Amazon River confluence.

References

External links
Yellow-crested manakin videos on the Internet Bird Collection
"Yellow-crowned manakin" photo gallery VIREO Photo-High Res
Photo-Medium Res; Article sunbirdtours
Photo-Medium Res; Article conservation.org.pe–Colombia Curiosa
Graphic-High Res & Synopsis--Heterocercus flavivertex; Article www.eln.gov.br

yellow-crested manakin
Birds of the Amazon Basin
Birds of Brazil
Birds of Venezuela
Birds of Colombia
yellow-crested manakin
Taxonomy articles created by Polbot